Mukim Rambai is a mukim in Tutong District, Brunei. The population was 1,404 in 2016.

Geography 
The mukim is located in the southern part of Tutong District, bordering Mukim Lamunin to the north, the Malaysian state of Sarawak to the east and south, Mukim Sukang and Mukim Bukit Sawat in Belait District to the south-west and west respectively, and Mukim Ukong to the north-west.

Demographics 
As of 2016 census, the population was 1,404 with  males and  females. The mukim had 250 households occupying 248 dwellings. The entire population lived in rural areas.

Villages 
As of 2016, Mukim Rambai comprised the following census villages:

Infrastructures 
The local primary schools include Rambai Primary School and Benutan Primary School.

Kampong Benutan Mosque is the sole mosque in the mukim. It was built in 1996 and can accommodate 200 worshippers.

Notable places 
The following places are located within the mukim's administrative boundaries:
 Tasek Merimbun, the largest natural lake in the country
 Benutan Dam
 Ulu Tutong Dam

References

Rambai
Tutong District